Basil Boniface (born 6 January 1962) is a Seychellois boxer. He competed in the men's welterweight event at the 1984 Summer Olympics.

References

1962 births
Living people
Seychellois male boxers
Olympic boxers of Seychelles
Boxers at the 1984 Summer Olympics
Place of birth missing (living people)
Welterweight boxers